The Roman Catholic Diocese of Shinan/Shíhnan/Enshi is a (dormant?) suffragan Latin diocese in the Ecclesiastical province of the Metropolitan archbishopric of Hankou in central China, yet depends on the missionary Congregation for the Evangelization of Peoples.

Its episcopal see is the city of Shinan (presently known as Enshi). No statistics available. Vacant since its sole incumbent's death in 1942, without apostolic administrator since 1950.

History 
 Established on June 14, 1938 as Apostolic Vicariate of Shinan 施南 / Shihnan / de Shinan (Latin), on territory split off from the then Apostolic Vicariate of Yichang 宜昌
 Promoted on April 11, 1946 as Diocese of Shinan 施南 / Enshi 恩施 (中文) / Shíhnan / Scenanen(sis) (Latin).

Episcopal ordinaries
(all Roman rite) 

Apostolic Vicar of Shinan 施南 
 Father John Baptist Hu Ruo-han (胡若翰) (Chinese) (February 13, 1940 – death 1942), Titular Bishop of Abbir Maius (1940.02.13 – 1942)

Suffragan Bishops of Shinan 施南 
Apostolic Administrator Noël Gubbels, Order of Friars Minor (O.F.M.) (born Belgium) (顧學德) (April 11, 1946 – November 18, 1950), while first Bishop of mother see Yichang 宜昌 (China) (1946.04.11 – 1950.11.18)
 indefinite vacancy''

See also 

 List of Catholic dioceses in China

References

Sources and external links 
 GCatholic.org - data for all sections
 Catholic Hierarchy

Roman Catholic dioceses in China
Religious organizations established in 1938
Roman Catholic dioceses and prelatures established in the 20th century
1938 establishments in China